Jaared (pronounced exactly like Jared) (born Ralph Jaared Arosemena in Washington, DC on January 20, 1967) is a Washington, DC-based contemporary jazz saxophonist.
In 2002 he was nominated the Best New Artist of the Year for 2002 by The National Smooth Jazz Association 

Jaared suffered from asthma as a child, and almost died on from the chronic lung disease. His doctor told his family that learning to play a wind instrument would strengthen his lungs, and Jaared chose the Alto Sax.

Jaared tours with a famous British contemporary jazz guitarist Peter White.

Jaared is a regular guest on the Jimi King show, which airs EST 12- 2 pm on Sundays.

Discography

Albums 
 Foreword – 2001 (Label: Lightyear)
 Hangtime – 2002 (Label: Lightyear)
 Addiction – 2008 (Label: Trippin 'n' Rhythm)
 Manhattan Nights – 2010 (Label: Trippin 'n' Rhythm)

References

External links 
 Official site

1967 births
Living people
Smooth jazz saxophonists
21st-century saxophonists